Ahmad Maher is an Egyptian film director. His directorial debut The Traveller (2009) competed for the Golden Lion at the 66th Venice International Film Festival. It was also screened in the Special Presentations section at the 2009 Toronto International Film Festival. Maher also served as the art director on the 1990 Martin Scorsese film Goodfellas.

References

External links

Egyptian film directors
Living people
Year of birth missing (living people)